Rajasthan Royals (RR) is a franchise cricket team based in Jaipur, India, which plays in the Indian Premier League (IPL). They were one of the eight teams that competed in the 2014 Indian Premier League. They were captained by Shane Watson. Rajasthan Royals finished 5th in the IPL and did not qualify for the champions league T20.

IPL

Standings
Rajasthan Royals finished 5th in the league stage of IPL 2014.

Match log

References

2014 Indian Premier League
Rajasthan Royals seasons